{{DISPLAYTITLE:C12H11N}}
The molecular formula C12H11N (molar mass: 169.22 g/mol) may refer to:

 Aminobiphenyls
 2-Aminobiphenyl (2-APB)
 3-Aminobiphenyl
 4-Aminobiphenyl (4-APB)
 Diphenylamine

Molecular formulas